Koşu is a railway station in İzmir, Turkey. The station is served by İZBAN, the commuter rail operator of İzmir. Koşu was built in 1970 as a station servicing the nearby Hippodrome. Koşu was rebuilt in 2009.

Connections
Tepeköy is serviced by several bus services that operate to neighboring towns and villages. The stop is located on 4550th Street.

References

External links
Koşu station İZBAN

Railway stations in İzmir Province
Railway stations opened in 1970
1970 establishments in Turkey
Buca District